Tommy A. Savas (born December 20, 1984) is an American actor and producer. He is known for Roger Dodger (2002), Seven Days (2007), Extra Butter, Please (2011).

Early life
Savas was born in Harlem, New York, United States. He was raised in Cresskill, New Jersey, the youngest of 4 children where, as a child, he showed a strong interest in acting and theatre. His grandfather fought in WWII.

By the age of six, he had studied improv and acting with Susan Dias Karnovsky and appeared in commercials and HBO and PBS children’s productions. Between school work and soccer games, Tommy continued to study privately with Joseph Daly, and at HB Studios in New York under Trudi Stible.

He spent time between New York and Los Angeles where he studied with Robert Lyons and Lynette McNeil, and had comedy training with Shari Shaw. Savas continued to hone his acting skills appearing in local theatre productions and in sketch comedy at the HA! Comedy Club in New York.

Career
His big break came at age 15 when he was selected out of 15,000 actors to play the role of Xavier, AJ Soprano’s high school friend in the renowned HBO series, The Sopranos. After The Sopranos, Savas landed a guest starring role in Law and Order: Special Victims Unit, as well as a part in the Tribeca Film Festival award-winning film Roger Dodger.

After graduating from high school, Savas moved out to Los Angeles to pursue his already burgeoning career and was quickly picked up to guest star in Cold Case, Without a Trace, Shark, The New Adventures of Old Christine, General Hospital, and many others. He can also be seen in many national commercials such as Gillette, Nesquik, Guitar Hero, Pizza Hut, and Subway.

Savas formed Reckless Tortuga with a small group of friends in 2009 as a means of continually creating things and working even if they weren’t booking work professionally. Reckless Tortuga became a popular YouTube web-based comedy channel, where he has a recurring role as Damian in the webseries, The Online Gamer.

In 2014, Savas played Cossetti in Michael Bay's post-apocalyptic TV Series The Last Ship. He also played series regular Dashiell Greer in Katherine Heigl's NBC drama, State of Affairs, which premiered November 2014.

In 2015, Savas co-wrote and starred in the dark comedy Bad Roomies alongside Patrick Renna. The movie was partially funded by Kickstarter ($75,000 was raised).

In 2016, Savas was cast as Reggie in the ABC comedy pilot 'The Fluffy Shop', co-written by and starring Gabriel Iglesias.

Savas jokingly stated that Shia Lebouf stole his career after they screen tested against each other for the role of a young Robert Downey Jr. in the movie A Guide to Recognizing your Saints and Lebouf got the part.

Personal life 
Savas occasionally works as a substitute teacher and has stated that if acting fell through, he would love to be a teacher.

Gary Oldman is an actor that Savas admires for his ability to play many different characters.

Filmography

Film

Television

References

External links
 

1984 births
Living people
21st-century American male actors
Male actors from New York (state)
American male film actors
American male television actors
People from Harlem
Male actors from New Jersey
People from Cresskill, New Jersey